Lance Thompson (born 23 July 1961) is an Australian former professional rugby league footballer who played for the Balmain Tigers and the Newtown Jets in the New South Wales Rugby Football League (NSWRFL).

Thompson, a shearer's son from the town of Nyngan, started his NSWRFL career at Balmain. He appeared as Balmain's five-eighth in the first two rounds of the 1980 NSWRFL season, then didn't play first-grade until 1983, when he was with Newtown. In his only first-grade season for Newtown he played 13 premiership games, as a five-eighth, centre and winger.

References

External links
Lance Thompson at Rugby League project

1961 births
Living people
Australian rugby league players
Rugby league players from Nyngan, New South Wales
Balmain Tigers players
Newtown Jets players
Rugby league five-eighths
Rugby league centres
Rugby league wingers